The Ballad of the Windshield Washers is a 1998 Italian drama film directed by Peter Del Monte. It is based on a novel by Edoardo Albinati. It was screened out of competition at the 59th Venice International Film Festival.

Cast 
Olek Mincer: Zygmunt
Kim Rossi Stuart: Rafal
Agata Buzek: Justyna
Andrzej Grabowski: Pawel
Grażyna Wolszczak: Helena
Elzhana Popova: Irina
Victor Cavallo: Driver
Maxime Kone: Ambulante

See also
Movies about immigration to Italy

References

External links

1998 films
Italian drama films
Films directed by Peter Del Monte
1998 drama films
Films about immigration
Films based on Italian novels
1990s Italian-language films
1990s Italian films